Ripon High School is a public high school located in Ripon, California at 301 N. Acacia Ave. The school averages around 909 students, from grades 9–12.  It is the only high school in the Ripon Unified School District. The school colors are red and white. In 2006, Ripon High School became one of the first schools in California to install various video cameras around the school with a stream to the local police department.

Sports
Ripon High School's mascot is Estanislao, to honor those who occupied the land before modern times.  Ripon High School is part of the Trans Valley League (TVL) for division IV high schools. Sports facilities include the Abeyta-Hortin Gym, North Gym, Stouffer Field, and various other sports venues.  The Abeyta-Hortin Gym, North Gym, and swimming facility have all had major renovations within the past several years.

Ripon offers six boys varsity sports (Football, Soccer, Basketball, Baseball, and Golf) five Girls varsity sports (Volleyball, Basketball, Soccer, Softball, and Golf) and five Co-ed sports (Cross Country, Tennis, Track, Wrestling, and Cheerleading).

Ripon's biggest rivals are the Ripon Christian Knights and Escalon Cougars.

Football

Ripon High School's football team won their first Section Championship since 1996 in 2019 with their Varsity squad, claiming League, Section, and State titles that year.

The school was Southern League Champion and Sac Joaquin Section Runner Up in 1976, captained by Scott MacDonald, David O'Leary and Ed Beeler.

Basketball

Ripon's girls' basketball team has also done quite well the last couple of years and is currently ranked 2nd in the TVL.  Ripon's boys' basketball team has done equally well and is currently ranked highly in the TVL.

Tennis

Ripon tennis won 3 league titles: 1965, 1987, and 2007.

Other activities
Army JROTC

The high school has a JROTC unit, and typically around 100 are enrolled in the program each year. It was formed in 1998 as an N.D.C.C and later earned JROTC in the 2000–2001 school year. The next year 2001-2002 the Battalion had earned an Honor Unit with Distinction. It competes throughout the year in drill competitions including the National Drill Competition in Daytona Beach Florida and performs in parades.

Leadership

Ripon High School has a Leadership/ASB program, which is the equivalent of the high school student government.

Ace Hardware larceny incident

In the spring of 2021, an attempted larceny took place on the Wilma Ave. Ace Hardware consisting of a portable power generator occurred by Stockton resident Jordan Anderson, before authorities were called and he fled into the playgrounds of Ripon Elementary, where after he entered into Ripon High's teacher parking lot. Upon entering the school, he was noticed by several students, but not reported. He climbed and hid on the roof of a portable classroom before appearing to the spectacle of several students and a lockdown was enacted. Upon being seen by Principal Rangel, he jumped off the classroom and escaped a gracefully failed tackle by the principal, before being apprehended after a several minute-long chase with police and staff. Kids went to lunch early that day after the lockdown was lifted and the video of the attempted tackle by Principal Rangel was posted on social media.

References

External links
Ripon Unified School District
Ripon High School

Public high schools in California
High schools in San Joaquin County, California